The Fight for Manod is a 1979 novel by Raymond Williams.

Plot summary
Matthew Price and Peter Owen both have their roots within the borders of Wales.  They each have contributed to a decision on the idea of building a new town, Manod, in the depopulated valleys of South Wales.  A splendid idea - or is there more going on behind the scenes than is admitted?

See also

 Border Country - a novel about Matthew Price's earlier life.
 Second Generation - a novel about Peter Owen's earlier life.

1979 British novels
Anglo-Welsh novels
Novels set in Wales
Chatto & Windus books
Novels by Raymond Williams